Scias or Skias was a settlement in ancient Arcadia. It was mentioned by Pausanias who visited the region in the 2nd century. It was 13 stadia (2 km) from Megalopolis, and 10 stadia from Charisia. Pausanias mentioned the ruins of the temple of Artemis Skiatis. The location of Scias is unknown today.

References

Populated places in ancient Arcadia
Former populated places in Greece
Arcadian city-states
Lost ancient cities and towns